La Mort de la gazelle is a 2008 documentary film.

Synopsis 
Since the late 1980s, a sporadic guerrilla war has plagued northern Niger somewhere in the Sahara. In 2007, a group of armed men attacked an army barracks. They claimed to be from the Niger Movement for Justice (NMJ). Hundreds of men then joined the movement. Jérémie Reichenbach films some of these men, ready to fight in a very uncertain atmosphere, between war and peace. Under duress of an invisible enemy, isolated from the rest of the world, they wait for the fight.

Awards 
 Brive (France) 2009

References 

2008 films
2008 documentary films
French documentary films
Documentary films about war
Films set in Niger
Films shot in Niger
2000s in Niger
2000s French films